Kohtru is a village in Märjamaa Parish, Rapla County in western Estonia.

Notes

Villages in Rapla County